Putorino is a small farming settlement in northern Hawke's Bay, on the eastern side of New Zealand's North Island. It is located on State Highway 2 between Tutira and Mohaka, on the Hastings side of the border between Hastings and Wairoa.

Pūtōrino was originally a Māori settlement at the mouth of the Waikari River, at an important stopping point for canoes. It became a European settlement in the 1860s, and move inland to the main Napier to Wairoa Road in the early 20th century. The modern village includes a hotel and sports centre.

Flooding during Cyclone Gabrielle destoyed the  State Highway 2 (SH2) bridge over the river at Putorino.

Education

References

Hastings District
Populated places in the Hawke's Bay Region